Mac's La Sierra is a New Mexican cuisine restaurant in the city of Albuquerque, New Mexico. It is a landmark restaurant on U.S. Route 66.

History
The restaurant has remained family owned since it was founded in 1952.

Today
Mac's La Sierra serves their "steak in the rough", which is deep-fried steak fingers with french fries, as well as other New Mexican fair like, huevos rancheros, Indian tacos, enchiladas, and green chile stew. The restaurant is a favorite of Steven Michael Quezada and Martin Chávez. It has also been a location by Martin Heinrich for his "Congress On Your Corner", and they catered during the opening of his campaign headquarters.

References

External links
 

Restaurants established in 1952
Restaurants in Albuquerque, New Mexico
1952 establishments in New Mexico